William, Bishop of Orange took part in the First Crusade. In 1096 Hugh of Châteauneuf, Bishop of Grenoble and William, Bishop of Orange, went to Genoa and preached in the church of San Siro, in order to gather troops for the First Crusade. After the death of Adhemar of Le Puy in August 1098 in Antioch, he was recognized as leader of the clergy, until he himself died six months later in December 1098 in Ma'arrat al-Nu'man.

References

External links
 Medieval Sourcebook: The Siege and Capture of Jerusalem: Collected Accounts

1098 deaths
Year of birth unknown

Christians of the First Crusade

11th-century French Roman Catholic bishops
Bishops of Orange